Juehai Temple is a Buddhist temple located in Nanhu District of Jiaxing, Zhejiang, China.

History
The temple traces its origins to the former Baozhong Taoist Temple, founded by official Zhao Rupai in 1249 in the Southern Song dynasty (1127–1279) and would later become a Buddhist temple named Baozhong Temple in 1364 in the Mongolian ruling Yuan dynasty (1271–1368). It was completely destroyed by wars during the late Yuan and early Ming dynasties. In 1417, in the fifteen year of Yongle period (1403–1424), the temple was rebuilt by monks. In 1733 in the Qing dynasty (1644–1911), Yongzheng Emperor issued the decree building the temple and honored the name, which has been used to date. The Mahavira Hall and wing rooms were demolished during the Taiping Rebellion (1851–1864) and soon reconstructed between 1862 and 1875.

Architecture
The complex include the following halls: Shanmen, Mahavira Hall, Hall of Three Saints, Bell tower, Drum tower, Dining Room, etc.

Gallery

References

Buddhist temples in Zhejiang
Buildings and structures in Jiaxing
Tourist attractions in Zhejiang
19th-century establishments in China
19th-century Buddhist temples